The Busan–Ulsan Expressway Co., Ltd., operating as the Busan–Ulsan Expressway, is a limited company in South Korea, it made and is operating Haeundae IC – Ulsan JC section of Donghae Expressway, connecting Haeundae District, Busan to Ulju County, Ulsan.

History 
The company opened on the Haeundae IC – Ulsan JC section of Donghae Expressway 29 December 2008 and was created to reduce travel time between Busan and Ulsan from 57 minutes to 30 minutes. The cost of the toll road was set to KRW3,500 (US$3.12 as of April 2013) on the date of opening.

See also 
 Roads and expressways in South Korea
 South Korea portal
 Transportation in South Korea
 Ulsan Expressway
 Donghae Expressway

References

External links 
 

Transport in Ulsan